Steve Spangler (born December 8, 1966)  is an American television personality, author and science teacher. Spangler founded Steve Spangler Science and its wholesale division, Be Amazing Toys. He served as CEO of Steve Spangler Science and the creative director of Be Amazing Toys. Both companies develop science education teaching tools and toys. Spangler posted the first Diet Coke and Mentos video on YouTube in September 2005 and his 2002 televised demonstration of the eruption went viral launching a chain of several other Diet Coke and Mentos experiment viral videos. He earned two Heartland Emmy Awards and a total of five Emmy nominations. Spangler holds a Guinness World Record for the largest physics lesson and is an inductee of the National Speakers Association Speaker Hall of Fame.

Career

Education work

Spangler's career began as a science teacher in the Cherry Creek School District in Colorado. As part of a science outreach program, Spangler created a traveling science show targeted to elementary and middle school students in an effort to increase interest in science. In 1991, Spangler began traveling throughout Colorado and the surrounding states to present school assembly programs and teacher training workshops focused on using more inquiry-based science activities in the classroom.

Spangler presented over 4,500 science shows for students and teachers at approximately 900 schools throughout the U.S. from 1991-2003 when the tour ended.

In 1992, Spangler began working as an adjunct faculty member at the Regis University in the Department of Chemistry. He served as the Executive Director of the National Hands-on Science Institute until 2001. The institute combined professional development for elementary and middle school teachers with an authentic lab experience for teachers to test out best practices and hands-on learning strategies with Denver-area children who attended an afternoon science camp.

Spangler hosts several summer science institutes as professional development science educators. Science in the Rockies offers strategies and best practices for increasing hands-on engagement in the classroom. In 2009, Spangler partnered with Holland America Cruise Line to offer an environmental science curriculum exploring the inside passage of Alaska.

Television work
During his first year of teaching, a producer from the Denver, Colorado NBC affiliate KCNC-TV offered Spangler a position as a science host on News for Kids after seeing him perform a science demonstration show at a public event. News for Kids premiered in 1991 and was picked up for national syndication in 1993, airing in 185 cities every Saturday morning. After six seasons, Spangler produced 220 segments that featured simple science experiments that viewers could easily recreate at home. Spangler received a Heartland Emmy Award for his work on News for Kids in 1997.

In 2001, Spangler joined the Denver NBC affiliate, KUSA-TV 9NEWS as their Science Education Contributor. His weekly science segments feature science demonstrations and experiments that encourage viewers to learn more about science. Denver, Colorado NBC affiliate, KUSA-TV 9News.

Spangler has also been featured on Food Network, Discovery Channel, HGTV, NBC Nightly News, History Channel, Today Show, Good Morning America, The Weather Channel, VH1, QVC, Modern Marvels, The Doctors and DIY.

The Diet Coke and Mentos eruption experiment was first televised by Spangler in 2002 and  became popular on the Internet in 2005. More than a thousand videos appeared online replicating the experiment. Spangler was nominated for the Time 100 in 2007 because of the experiment. He signed a licensing agreement with Perfetti Van Melle, the maker of MENTOS, in 2006 and developed a line of toys to be used with the experiment.

Spangler made his first appearance on the Ellen DeGeneres Show in 2007. One of his show demonstrations, Walking on Water, consisted of mixing 2,500 pounds of cornstarch and 500 gallons of water into a large container to create a Non-Newtonian fluid.

Other work
Spangler founded Steve Spangler Science and Be Amazing Toys, the wholesale division of Steve Spangler Science. Steve served as the CEO of Steve Spangler Science until 2018 when the company was sold to Really Good Stuff, LLC, a division of Excelligence Learning Corporation.

Spangler is the author of seven books: Down to a Science, Taming the Tornado Tube, Bounce No Bounce, Fizz Factor, Secret Science, Naked Eggs and Flying Potatoes, Fire Bubbles and Exploding Toothpaste.

Spangler is also known for the Sick Science! YouTube channel, which received 170M views by 2020. The channel contains instructional videos on simple at home or classroom science experiments.  He also runs a TikTok account which has been verified and has amassed more than 1.2M followers and 16.5M likes as of November 19, 2020.

Awards
Spangler received a Heartland Emmy Award in 1997 for his contribution the television program News for Kids.  In 2010, he received a Heartland Emmy Award for Spangler Science - Weather and Science Day at Coors Field. Spangler also received a Guinness World Record for the largest physics lesson.

Spangler was inducted into the National Speakers Association's Speaker Hall of Fame in 2010.

In October 2011, Spangler was selected as one of 100 initial partners for the YouTube Original Channel Initiative and received funding for the production of new original programming. Spangler's YouTube show, The Spangler Effect, debuted February 1, 2012.

Personal life

Steve Spangler was born on December 8, 1966 in Denver, Colorado. He graduated from the University of Colorado Boulder with a dual degree in chemistry and humanities in 1989. Spangler has three sons.

References

External links
Steve Spangler
Steve Spangler Science

Video experiments on 9News
"A blog, a bottle, a mint" - Toronto Star

Living people
American chief executives
Emmy Award winners
1966 births
American scientists